Accordion is a 1934 Soviet musical film directed by Igor Savchenko.

Plot
The merry village accordionist Timofey Dudin, or as known by his nickname Timoshka, is elected secretary at one of the Komsomol units. This high office, in his opinion, is not compatible with playing on the accordion. The unusual prolonged silence leads quickly to a discord between the true Komsomol and the kulak supporters which causes Timoshka to pick up his accordion again ...

Cast
 Zoya Fyodorova - Marusenka
 Pyotr Savin - Timoshka
 Igor Savchenko - son of a kulak
 Nikolay Gorlov - Mitya
 Nikolai Yarochkin 
 Nikolai Zyryanov 
 Pyotr Gorelov 
 Lyalya Sateyeva
 Ye. Yukhova 
 E. Pirogova

Production
Poet Aleksandr Zharov assisted Savchenko with the rhymed dialog. The film was made from concept to release in eight months at a time when the average production time would extend into years.

References

Bibliography 
 Christie, Ian & Taylor, Richard. The Film Factory: Russian and Soviet Cinema in Documents 1896-1939. Routledge, 2012.

External links 
 

Films directed by Igor Savchenko
1934 musical comedy films
Soviet musical comedy films
Russian musical comedy films
Soviet black-and-white films
1930s Russian-language films
1934 films
Russian black-and-white films